South Mountain is a Canadian country music group. They received the 1991 Canadian Country Music Association Vista Rising Star Award. Their 1995 single "Radioland" reached the Top 20 of the RPM Country Tracks chart.

Discography

Albums

Singles

References

External links

Canadian country music groups
Musical groups established in 1991
Musical groups from Ontario
1991 establishments in Ontario
Canadian Country Music Association Rising Star Award winners